Taco Chronicles (Spanish: Las Crónicas del Taco) is an American-Mexican documentary streaming television series focusing on tacos, Mexico's favorite street food. There is rich history and culture behind each variety of tacos, and the series tries to be both educational and stylish about the different kinds and where they come from, through interviews with food writers, experts, and owners of the stands seen on the streets, who describe them and the ingredients in depth.

It premiered on Netflix on July 12, 2019. Its second volume / season premiered on September 15, 2020.

Episodes

Series overview

Volume 1 (2019)

Volume 2 (2020)

Volume 3 (2022)

Release
The full first season, consisting of six episodes, premiered on Netflix streaming on July 12, 2019.

References

External links

2010s American documentary television series
2019 American television series debuts
2019 Mexican television series debuts
2020s American documentary television series
Spanish-language Netflix original programming
Netflix original documentary television series
Food and drink television series
Taco